The Treasure Garden is a residential skyscraper located in Xitun District, Taichung, Taiwan. It is designed by Antonio Citterio Patricia Viel and Partners. As of December 2020, it is the 9th tallest building in Taichung and 29th tallest in Taiwan.

See also 
 List of tallest buildings in Taiwan
 List of tallest buildings in Taichung
 Taichung's 7th Redevelopment Zone
 Antonio Citterio
 La Bella Vita (skyscraper)

References

2017 establishments in Taiwan
Residential skyscrapers in Taiwan
Skyscrapers in Taichung
Taichung's 7th Redevelopment Zone
Apartment buildings in Taiwan
Residential buildings completed in 2017